Grass tetany is a metabolic disease involving magnesium deficiency, which can occur in such ruminant livestock as beef cattle, dairy cattle and sheep, usually after grazing on pastures of rapidly growing grass, especially in early spring.

Symptoms and cause 
Progressive symptoms may include grazing away from the herd, irritability, muscle twitching, staring, incoordination, staggering, collapse, thrashing, head thrown back, and coma, followed by death.  However, clinical signs are not always evident before the animal is found dead.

The condition results from hypomagnesemia (low magnesium concentration in blood) which may reflect low magnesium intake, low magnesium absorption, unusually low retention of magnesium, or a combination of these.  Commonly, apparent symptoms develop only when hypomagnesemia is accompanied by hypocalcemia (blood Ca below 8 mg/dL).

Low magnesium intake by grazing ruminants may occur especially with some grass species early in the growing season, due to seasonally low magnesium concentrations in forage dry matter.   Some conserved forages are also low in magnesium and may be conducive to hypomagnesemia.

High potassium intake relative to calcium and magnesium intake may induce hypomagnesemia.  A K/(Ca+Mg) charge ratio exceeding 2.2 in forages has been commonly considered a risk factor for grass tetany.  Potassium fertilizer application to increase forage production may contribute to an increased K/(Ca+Mg) ratio in forage plants, not only by adding potassium to soil, but also by displacing soil-adsorbed calcium and magnesium by ion exchange, contributing to increased susceptibility of calcium and magnesium to leaching loss from the root zone during rainy seasons.   In ruminants, high potassium intake results in decreased absorption of magnesium from the digestive tract.

Trans-aconitate, which accumulates in some grasses, can be a risk factor for hypomagnesemia in grazing ruminants.  (Tetany has been induced in cattle by administration of trans-aconitate and KCl, where the amount of KCl used was, by itself, insufficient to induce tetany.)  Relatively high levels of trans-aconitate have been found in several forage species on rangeland sites conducive to hypomagnesemia.  Although at least one rumen  organism converts trans-aconitate to acetate, other rumen organisms convert trans-aconitate to tricarballylate, which complexes with magnesium. Using rats as an animal model, oral administration of tricarballylate has been shown to reduce an animal's magnesium retention.    Potassium fertilizer application results in increased concentration of aconitic acid in some grass species.

Prevention 
Magnesium supplements are used to prevent the disease when ruminants, for obvious economic reasons, must have access to dangerous pastures.

Treatment 
The affected animal should be left in the pasture, and not forced to come back to stall because excitation can darken the prognosis, even  after adequate treatment.

Intravenous mixed calcium and magnesium injection are used. Subcutaneous injection of magnesium sulfate (200 ml of 50% solution) is also recommended.

Epidemiology 
In Northern Europe, the disease occurs after winter housing. But in Australia and New Zealand, where the cows are not housed, the disease occurs in similar conditions, when the animal enters lush, grass-dominant pastures.  In North America, grass tetany occurs most commonly when range stock are moved onto lush early pasture or when housed stock are turned out onto such pasture in the spring.  A second high-risk period may occur in the fall.  Although cereal grasses (e.g. winter wheat) and crested wheatgrass may be especially conducive to grass tetany, the problem can also occur with several other grass species.  "Winter tetany" may occur with some silages, low-magnesium grass hays, or corn stover.

References

External links 

 Related page of the Merck Veterinary Manual

Bovine diseases